Harvey v Facey [1893], is a contract law case decided by the United Kingdom Judicial Committee of the Privy Council on appeal from the Supreme Court of Judicature of Jamaica. In 1893 the Privy Council held final legal jurisdiction over most of the British Caribbean. Its importance in case law is that it defined the difference between an offer and supply of information. The Privy Council held that indication of lowest acceptable price does not constitute an offer to sell. Rather, it is considered a response to a request for information, specifically a "precise answer to a precise question" about the lowest acceptable price which the seller would consider.

Application
The case involved negotiations over a property in Jamaica. The defendant, Mr LM Facey, had been carrying on negotiations with the Mayor and Council of Kingston to sell a piece of property to Kingston City. On 7 October 1893, Facey was traveling on a train between Kingston and Porus and the appellant, Harvey, who wanted the property to be sold to him rather than to the City, sent Facey a telegram. It said, "Will you sell us Bumper Hall Pen? Telegraph lowest cash price-answer paid". Facey replied on the same day: "Lowest price for Bumper Hall Pen £900." Harvey then replied in the following words. "We agree to buy Bumper Hall Pen for the sum of nine hundred pounds asked by you. Please send us your title deed in order that we may get early possession."

Facey, however refused to sell at that price, at which Harvey sued. Harvey had his action dismissed upon first trial presided over by Justice Curran, (who declared that the agreement as alleged by the Appellants did not denote a concluded contract) but won his claim on the Court of Appeal, which reversed the trial court decision, declaring that a binding agreement had been proved. The appellants obtained leave from the Supreme Court of Judicature of Jamaica to appeal to the Queen in Council (i.e. the Privy Council). The Privy Council reversed the Appeal court's opinion, reinstating the  decision of Justice Curran in the very first trial and stating the reason for its action.

The Privy Council advised that no contract existed between the two parties. The first telegram was simply a request for information, so at no stage did the defendant make a definite offer that could be accepted. Lord Morris gave the following judgment.

See also
English contract law

Notes

External links
Full text of judgment on bailii.org

English contract case law
1890s in Jamaica
1893 in British law
Judicial Committee of the Privy Council cases on appeal from Jamaica
1893 in Jamaica